Big Springs is the name of a first-magnitude spring located in Island Park, Idaho in Fremont County. The spring produces over 120 million gallons of water each day. It is a primary source of the North Fork or Henrys Fork of the Snake River. The other major source is the Henry's Lake outlet. The Big Springs is also famous for its large rainbow trout which congregate at the foot of the bridge waiting to be fed by the tourists (there are coin-operated feeding dispensers) No fishing is allowed until below the outlet to Henry's Lake, several miles away. Big Springs is the only first-magnitude spring that issues from rhyolite lava flows. It is a National Natural Landmark designated in August 1980. The spring is in the Caribou-Targhee National Forest and the site is managed by the National Forest Service.  There is a half mile handicap-accessible trail that offers wildlife viewing of osprey, bald eagles, waterfowl and the occasional moose, white-tailed deer, and muskrat.

Next to Big Springs is a log cabin built by Johnny Sack  in 1929. The cabin is open to visitors.

Johnny Sack Cabin

Aerial View of Cabin and Big Springs

Plaque at Big Springs
Mill run by spring water at Johnny Sack Cabin.

Bibliography
Lopez, Tom (2000). Idaho, a Climbing Guide: Climbs, Scrambles, and Hikes. Seattle: Mountaineers' Press.
Tolman, Cyrus Fisher (1937).  Ground Water. New York: McGraw-Hill.

References

National Natural Landmarks in Idaho
Springs of Idaho
Bodies of water of Fremont County, Idaho
Caribou-Targhee National Forest